In Greek mythology, Iphito was an Amazon who served under Hippolyte. Her name is only known from inscriptions.

References
Blok, Josine H. The early Amazons: modern and ancient perspectives on a persistent myth. BRILL, 1995; page 218 (with a reference to Lexicon Iconographicum Mythologiae Classicae, "Amazones" entry, vol. 1, p. 653)

Amazons (Greek mythology)